Aeolanthes is a genus of small moths in the superfamily Gelechioidea.

Its relationships are enigmatic – many authors separate it in a monotypic subfamily Aeolanthinae, but there is disagreement over whether to place them in the Elachistidae, Lecithoceridae or Oecophoridae. Recent studies place it in the Depressariidae.

Species
 Aeolanthes ampelurga Meyrick, 1925
 Aeolanthes brochias Meyrick, 1938
 Aeolanthes callidora Meyrick, 1907
 Aeolanthes ceratopis Meyrick, 1934
 Aeolanthes cianolitha Meyrick, 1938
 Aeolanthes cladophora Meyrick, 1938
 Aeolanthes clinacta Meyrick, 1925
 Aeolanthes conductella (Walker, 1863)
 Aeolanthes coronifera Meyrick, 1938
 Aeolanthes cyclantha Meyrick, 1923
 Aeolanthes deltogramma Meyrick, 1923
 Aeolanthes diacritica Meyrick, 1918
 Aeolanthes dicraea Meyrick, 1908
 Aeolanthes erebomicta Meyrick, 1931
 Aeolanthes erythrantis Meyrick, 1935
 Aeolanthes euryatma Meyrick, 1908
 Aeolanthes haematopa Meyrick, 1931
 Aeolanthes lychnidias Meyrick, 1908
 Aeolanthes megalophthalma Meyrick, 1930
 Aeolanthes meniscias Meyrick, 1918
 Aeolanthes oculigera Diakonoff, 1952
 Aeolanthes rhodochrysa Meyrick, 1907
 Aeolanthes sagulata Meyrick, 1917
 Aeolanthes semicarnea Diakonoff, 1952
 Aeolanthes semiostrina Meyrick, 1935
 Aeolanthes sericanassa Meyrick, 1934
 Aeolanthes siphonias Meyrick, 1908

References

Natural History Museum Lepidoptera genus database

Depressariidae